Eetu Nousiainen (born 29 April 1997) is a Finnish ski jumper. He competed in two events at the 2018 Winter Olympics.

References

External links
 

1997 births
Living people
Finnish male ski jumpers
Olympic ski jumpers of Finland
Ski jumpers at the 2018 Winter Olympics
Place of birth missing (living people)
21st-century Finnish people